SV Werder Bremen II is the reserve team of SV Werder Bremen. It plays in Regionalliga, the fourth level of the German football league system, and has qualified for the first round of the DFB-Pokal on nineteen occasions. It also has won the German amateur football championship three times, a joint record. Until 2005 the team played as SV Werder Bremen Amateure.

It plays its home matches at Weserstadion Platz 11, adjacent to the first team's ground.

History
SV Werder Bremen Amateure first entered the highest league in the state of Bremen, then the tier two Amateurliga Bremen, in 1956, winning a league title in its first season there. The team played as a top side in this league, winning another title in 1962. With the introduction of the Bundesliga in 1963 and the Regionalliga below the Amateurliga Bremen slipped to third tier and Werder Amateure continued to play as a strong side at this level. A runners-up finish in 1966 qualified the team for the German amateur football championship where it defeated Hannover 96 Amateure to win the first of three titles in this competition. It won two more league titles in the Amateurliga in 1967 and 1968 but was knocked out early in the German amateur championship. The team continued as a top side in the league but came only eighth in 1973–74 when a top two finish was required to qualify for the Oberliga Nord, the new third tier in Northern Germany. From 1974 onwards, until 2008, it was also possible for the team to qualify for the German Cup through Bremen Cup wins and it did so on nineteen occasions from 1976 to 2008.

Werder Amateure won what was now the tier four Verbandsliga Bremen and earned promotion to the Oberliga in 1976, beginning an era of third division play that would last until 2012. The team played four average Oberliga Nord seasons before becoming one of the most successful teams in the league, winning championships in 1982 and 1984, and finishing runners-up in 1981, 1983 and 1992 but, as a reserve side, not being permitted to take part in the promotion round to the 2. Bundesliga. Through this success the team became a regular in the German amateur championship, winning titles in 1985 and 1991 and making losing appearances in the 1982 and 1993 finals. In 1994 when the Regionalliga Nord was established in the region as the new third tier Werder Amateure was one of the team's qualified.

The team was not quite as successful in the new Regionalliga in the era from 1994 to 2008 as it had been in the Oberliga, a third place in 1997 being its best-ever result. It did however achieve its two best DFB-Pokal runs in this time, reaching the third round in 1999–2000 and 2007–08, on both occasions going out to VfB Stuttgart. In 2008 the team was one of three reserve sides to qualify for the new 3. Liga, the new third tier of German league football. Werder Bremen II played four seasons at this level, never finishing higher than thirteenth and was relegated from the league in 2012, after 37 seasons at the third tier of German football. The team entered the Regionalliga Nord again, now at the fourth tier and finished runners-up in the league in 2013–14, followed by a league championship the season after. The latter allowed the club to participate in the promotion round to the 3. Liga where it defeated Borussia Mönchengladbach II 2–0 away after a nil-all draw at home and earned promotion back to the third tier.

Honours
The team's honours:
 German amateur championship:
Champions: 1966, 1985, 1991
Runners-up: 1982, 1993
 Regionalliga Nord:
Champions: 2015
 Oberliga Nord:
Champions: 1982, 1984
 Bremen-Liga:
Champions: 1957, 1962, 1967, 1968, 1976
 Bremer Pokal:
Winners: 1969, 1971, 1976, 1982, 1983, 1987, 1989, 1990, 1992–95, 1997–2002, 2004, 2007

Players

Current squad

Out on loan

Recent seasons
The recent season-by-season performance of the club:

 With the introduction of the Regionalligas in 1994 and the 3. Liga in 2008 as the new third tier, below the 2. Bundesliga, all leagues below dropped one tier.

Key

References

External links
Official website
SV Werder Bremen II at Worldfootball.net

SV Werder Bremen
Werder II
German reserve football teams
Sport in Bremen (city)
Football clubs in Germany
Bremen reserve football teams
3. Liga clubs